This is a list of films produced or distributed by GMA Pictures, founded in 1995 as Cinemax Studios. It is the main motion picture production and distribution arm of GMA Network.

1994

1995

1996

1997

1998

1999

2000

2005

2006

2007

2008

2009

2010

2011

2012

2013

2014

2015

2016

2019

Upcoming

List of Backyard Productions films

2019

References

External links
 Website